The HTBLVA Graz-Ortweinschule is a Höhere technische Bundeslehr- und Versuchsanstalt (engl. Higher Technical College) in the district Geidorf of the Austrian city Graz.

History 
Within the framework of the Trades Association, a winter school for master builders and  also began in 1866. In 1872, the trade association founded the Styrian Art Industry Association in the Schießstatt building in Pfeifengasse, later Ortweinplatz. From 1926 to 1932, a new school building was constructed on Ortweinplatz according to the plans of the architect . Since 1987, the school has been located in a new building on the Körösistraße in the north of Graz, next to the BRG ("Bundesrealgymnasium") Körösi, which is on the corner of Ortweingasse.

Education offers 
Higher Department of Civil Engineering.
 Hochbau (Structural Engineering)
 Tiefbau (Civil Engineering)
 Holzbau (Timber Construction)
 Bauwirtschaft (Construction Industry)
Higher Department of Art and Design.
 Grafik- und Kommunikationsdesign (Graphics and Communication Design)
 Film und MultimediaArt (Film and Multimedia Art)
 Fotografie und MultimediaArt (Photography and Multimedia Art)
 Innenarchitektur Raum- und Objektgestaltung (Interior Design Room and Object Design)
 Produktdesign Präsentation (Product Design Presentation)
 Bildhauerei Objektdesign Restaurierung (Sculpture Object Design Restauration)
 Keramik Art Craft (Ceramics Art Craft)
 Schmuck Metall Design (Jewellery Metal Design)

Principals 
 1876–1879 August Ortwein
 1879–1902 Carl Lauzil
 1902–1911 August Gunolt
 1919–1934 Adolf von Inffeld
 1934–1935 Ferdinand Pamberger
 1935–1938 Eduard Populorum
 1940–1945 Rudolf Hofer
 1945–1949 Eduard Populorum
 1956–1974 Otto Pilecky
 1974–1991 Horst Altenburger
 1991–1993 Peter Trummer
 1993–2012 Reinhold Neumann
 2012 Friederike El-Heliebi
 since 2012 Manfred Kniepeiss

Well-known former students and professors 
 Annemarie Avramidis
 Maria Biljan-Bilger
 Erwin Bohatsch
 Hans Brandstetter
 Günter Brus
 Karl Fischl
 Wilhelm Gösser
 Marion Kreiner
 Monika Martin
 Franz Leopold Schmelzer
 Werner Schwab
 Soap&Skin
 Markus Wilfling

References

Further reading

External links 
 
 

Education in Austria
Schools in Graz